The NAMC YS-11 is a turboprop airliner designed and built by the Nihon Aircraft Manufacturing Corporation (NAMC), a Japanese consortium. It was the only post-war airliner to be wholly designed and manufactured in Japan until the development of the Mitsubishi SpaceJet during the 2010s, roughly 50 years later.

Development of the YS-11 can be largely attributed to Japan's Ministry of International Trade and Industry (MITI), which had encouraged Japanese aircraft companies to collaborate on the development of a short-haul airliner as early as 1954. In 1959, NAMC was formed to design and produce an aircraft to satisfy MITI's requirements, dubbed the YS-11. On 30 August 1962, the first prototype performed its maiden flight. Deliveries commenced on 30 March 1965, and commercial operations began the following month. The majority of orders for the type were issued from various Japanese airliners. While sales to such customers were swift in the YS-11's initial years of availability, this limited market soon became saturated, leading to a slump in demand.

Production of the type came to an end in 1974 as a result of efforts to increase sales to international clients, including the creation of the better YS-11A variation. In the end, the YS-11 had shown that Japan was capable of building an airliner, but NAMC had racked up a huge debt, and the type is generally regarded as a commercial failure. Large numbers of the type continued to be in service until 2006, at which point tighter Japanese aircraft regulations imposed by the Ministry of Land, Infrastructure, Transport and Tourism necessitated either the withdrawal or refitting of all YS-11s. By 2018, only a single example reportedly remained in commercial service.

Development and design

Origins
During the mid-to-late 1950s, the Japanese Ministry of International Trade and Industry (MITI) identified a requirement for a short-haul airliner to replace Douglas DC-3s flying on Japan's domestic routes, and encouraged companies in Japan's aircraft industry to collaborate to develop and produce a domestic airliner to meet this need. Towards this purpose, in May 1957, the Commercial Transport Design Research Association was established and the availability of government subsidies guaranteed. From the government's viewpoint, the development of such an airliner was viewed as a key initiative towards the post-war revival of the nation's aircraft companies, which came in addition to the serious ambition to become a major international competitor in the global airliner business. Furthermore, while this requirement had been conceived primarily in a commercial context, there was an early recognition of the value for multiple branches of the Japanese Defense Agency (JDA) to be readily able to adopt the type as well; as a philosophy, this not only extended to the prospective airliner itself, but the various technologies involved in its development and manufacture.

In response to this encouragement, during 1957, a joint venture between Mitsubishi Heavy Industries, Kawasaki Heavy Industries, Fuji Heavy Industries (better known as the parent company of automobile manufacturer Subaru), Shin Meiwa, Showa Aircraft Industry Company and Japan Aircraft Industry Company was established for the purpose of developing and manufacturing the envisioned airliner. Two years later, this partnership was formalised as the Nihon Aeroplane Manufacturing Company (NAMC). The ownership of NAMC was initially divided between the Japanese government, which held 54% of the shares, while the constituent aircraft manufacturers held an 18% stake and several components/materials suppliers owned 11%; the remaining shares were small stakes belonging to various banks, insurance companies, and stock firms who chose to invest in the programme. However, NAMC was essentially a "paper company", being reliant upon both personnel and infrastructure provided by its constituent manufacturers.

NAMC designed a low-winged twin-turboprop-engined monoplane, capable of seating up to 60 passengers, dubbed the YS-11. Amongst the design team was Jiro Horikoshi, who had previously been the designer of the famed wartime Mitsubishi A6M Zero fighter. Another prominent engineer on the project was Teruo Tojo, the second son of Prime Minister Hideki Tojo, who later became chairman of Mitsubishi Motors. The twin-engined YS-11 was projected as delivering similar operational performance to the four-engined British-built Vickers Viscount, while possessing 50% greater capacity than the similarly configured Dutch-built Fokker F27 Friendship. MITI supervised the pricing of the aircraft in order to ensure that it was competitive with the American-built Martin 4-0-4.

Although the tentative aircraft was mainly designed and manufactured in Japan, the engine selected to power the airliner was the 2,275 kW (3,050 ehp) Rolls-Royce Dart RDa.10/1 powerplant, which was both developed and produced by British-based company Rolls-Royce. Furthermore, according to author Stephen C Mercado, due to the lack of available domestic technology at the time, several of the key aircraft systems, such as cabin pressurization, were copied from foreign sources; such information was gleaned from a combination of Japanese airlines, trading companies and diplomats. Throughout the YS-11's production lifetime, its electronic equipment, avionics, mechanical and fuselage components were supplied by a combination of Japanese companies and foreign suppliers.

Name
The “YS” of the YS-11 comes from a combination of the first letter sounds of the two Japanese words yusō (transport) and sekkei (design), which refer to the Association for Research on Transport Aircraft Design (Yusōki sekkei kenkyū kyōkai). Meanwhile, the first “1” of the “11” refers to the various engine candidates considered for the YS-11; the Rolls-Royce Dart RDa.10/1, which was the engine selected, had been designated “number 1.” The second “1” refers to the aircraft specification plan selected for the YS-11, which had been one among many plans that differed by wing placement and size. There had also been a “plan 0” at one point.

A catchphrase developed around the public reveal of the YS-11 mockup, which was “Let’s meet on the 11th at Sugita in Yokohama.” Here, Yokohama represented the “Y,” the Sugita neighborhood stood for the “S,” and the 11th referred both to the plane and to the date of the public reveal (December 11, 1958). Because of this, it became common to read the “11” in “YS-11” as “eleven” (jūichi in Japanese). For those involved in designing the plane, meanwhile, the designation had originally been pronounced “YS-one-one” (or YS ichi ichi).

Into flight
On 30 August 1962, the first prototype performed its maiden flight from Nagoya Airport; it was soon followed by the second prototype, flying on 28 December 1962. Early flight testing revealed several issues to troubleshoot, including poor steering, excessive vibration and noise. There was also an acute lack of safety during sideways maneuvers; the wake of the propeller produced abnormal forces that inclined the aircraft to the right; all of the rudders were ineffective; and the maneuverability was worst of all. These problems produced a tailspin during the flight test, and were the direct cause of a crash. This was known as the “three rudder problem.”

In one prestigious early flight of the type, All Nippon Airways used a YS-11 to carry the Olympic torch in the run-up to the 1964 Summer Olympics in Tokyo. It received its Japanese Type certificate on 25 August 1964, while American Federal Aviation Administration (FAA) certification followed on 9 September 1965. Prior to applying for certification, the FAA had been involved in the programme at NAMC's invitation, performing informal project reviews so that defects could be identified and eliminated early on.

During the late 1960s, a lack of significant international sales led to the programme incurring persistent losses, the outstanding debt eventually growing to $600 million. Due to the organisation of the programme, the aircraft manufacturers themselves did not have any of this debt apportioned to themselves, NAMC being held solely responsible; Mercado criticised this approach as it meant there was no incentive for the individual companies to make cost savings while simultaneously guarantee profit to them on every plane produced. Furthermore, it had been alleged that some participants saw the YS-11 as only a training programme to develop their employees' skills, rather than a serious commercial initiative; some participants chose to rotate large numbers of staff in and out of the project for brief periods before re-tasking them to work on internal projects.

Marcado claims that the programme's operational mindset was closer to that of a military project than a commercial one, while a preoccupation with government-issued performance criteria obstructed considerations towards the actual desires of the commercial operators, such as operating costs and cabin configuration, that the YS-11 was marketed towards. As this was Japan's first, and for a long time only, post-war airliner, NAMC lacked any staff with experience in marketing towards airlines, a disadvantage against the salesmen of rival airframers. This failure to address a crucial factor in acquiring new customers has been attributed as a major contributing cause of the programme's poor commercial reception.

The end of the YS-11 programme was precipitated by the 1971 Smithsonian Agreement, which led to an appreciation in the value of the Japanese yen and the resulting impact upon the nation's economy. By this point, it was clear that there was little chance that the YS-11 could ever come close to breaking even. These myriad factors contributed to the decision for production to be terminated after the completion of 182 aircraft. On 11 May 1973, the last YS-11 was delivered to the Japanese Maritime Self-Defence Force (JMSDF).

Operational history
On 23 October 1964, the first production YS-11 conducted its first flight; it was delivered to its customer on 30 March 1965. During April 1965, initial airline operations commenced with launch customer Toa Airways. By 1968, the YS-11 programme accounted for about half of all aircraft production taking place in Japan that year. Early deliveries were mainly made to Japanese airlines, but orders for the type slowed drastically after the satisfaction of the outstanding needs of the Japanese commuter airlines for which the aircraft had been designed. Initial attempts were made to market the airliner towards various countries across Southeast Asia; at one point, the Japanese government was allegedly encouraging such sales as a form of war reparations.

Seeking to make the aircraft more attractive to the highly active North American market, NAMC decided to develop the YS-11A, a new variant which possessed a higher gross weight. During 1966, a lease agreement was signed between NAMC and Hawaiian Air Lines, a move which was hailed as the "first step" in the programme's new America-focused campaign. While a number of aircraft would be sold internationally, these were often at a loss as the sales price had been set so low, deliberately as to undercut competing airliners, but paid little heed to production costs; this deficit led to losses mounting more rapidly than anticipated.

A major customer for the YS-11 was the American operator Piedmont Airlines, who had been seeking the optimal modern airliner to serve their existing routes, which mostly comprised a number of small, mountainous airports. After evaluating numerous aircraft around the world, the company determined that the Japanese airliner was the most suitable; according to Piedmont's president, Thomas H Davis: "The YS‐11 was the only one we could find which would do it on an economical basis". During October 1967, Piedmont Airlines ordered a batch of ten YS-11A-200s along with an option for an additional ten aircraft for $22.5 million. The company was so impressed by its performance, it both exercised the option for ten aircraft and purchased an additional YS-11, operating a combined fleet of 21 YS-11s by mid-1970. Piedmont would be the type's largest international operator; ultimately, no other airline would place another order of this scale.

End of production

Commercial sales of the YS-11 began to stall without a stable structure in place for sales. Especially outside of Japan, the YS-11 was forced to compete with other country's models with long-term low deferred interest payments. Nor was it rare for NAMC to have to sell the YS-11 at a discount, as this was Japan's first commercial airliner since the end of World War II, and had no proven track record. Additionally, it was also said that there was mismanagement of the program's cost management, as initial estimates had neglected to include the cost advertising or company administration. Moreover, because multiple companies were involved with the aircraft manufacturing, it was unclear who held ultimate responsibility, nor could the price of delivered parts be reduced. An increase in former government employees appointed to the company began to spread a culture of bureaucracy, making necessary drastic management reforms impossible and further increasing the program's deficit.

In particular, there was deficit in sales activities outside of Japan that were a result of fundamental problems in NAMC's administrative activities in the United States, as indicated by the Japanese government Board of Audit; this is to say nothing of the unforeseen loss due to a less favorable currency exchange that resulted after the American government switched to a floating exchange rate in 1971. When Jenks Caldwell of Charlotte Aircraft Corporation, a sales dealer of used aircraft and aviation parts headquartered in North Carolina, expressed a strong desire to become a sales agent in the United States through a modification of YS-11A, NAMC signed an exclusive agency contract with his company to manage sales for North America, Latin America and Spain. However, Charlotte Aircraft did not actually carry out the promised activities, and when a sales agreement with Piedmont Airlines was concluded with Mitsui, Charlotte Aircraft demanded damages under their status as exclusive dealer, and Piedmont Airlines and Cruzeiro do Sul handed over 33 used aircraft traded in for YS-11 to Charlotte Aircraft; Japan's Board of Audit complained these actions were unfair.  This event became a problem in the Diet, and the managing director of NAMC resigned. NAMC had no experience of selling passenger planes, and so it concluded a contract with Charlotte Aircraft without conducting an investigation into the company's trustworthiness or business practices, nor without creating a clause in the event Charlotte Aircraft refused to conduct sales. When the contract with Charlotte Aircraft was terminated, NAMC was forced to pay 23,000,000 yen and turn over used aircraft.

In addition, any requests for a reduction in sales price or delayed payments by airlines had to be reviewed by governmental organizations like the Ministry of Finance or the Ministry of International Trade and Industry. It was said that there were many instances of contracts that could not be concluded due to the absence of the various ministry's approval.

By 1994, 112 YS-11s remained in service; the lengthy service life of the type, despite the short manufacturing lifespan, has been hailed by some officials as evidence of the type being successful in some respect. The YS-11 was slowly phased out by Japanese airlines up until the early 2000s, at which point the withdrawal rate spiked in response to new directives issued by the Ministry of Land, Infrastructure, Transport and Tourism that required all commercial aircraft in Japan to be fitted with a Traffic Collision Avoidance System (TCAS); any aircraft lacking TCAS were forced to cease operations at the end of 2006. Reportedly, equipping a YS-11 with TCAS had been estimated as costing around ¥100 million (about US$1 million), such a refit was deemed economically unsound. Those aircraft that remained in a flight-worthy condition were typically sold to foreign companies. On 30 September 2006, Japan Air Commuter Flight 3806 marked the final flight of a YS-11 within Japan's commercial aviation industry.

In 2007, the YS-11 was added to the Mechanical Engineering Heritage of Japan as item number 13. , fifteen were operated by the Japanese military, and two in Mexico. , only eight remained in service with the Japan Air Self-Defense Force, which were being used for flight checks and other ancillary purposes. , two aircraft remain in commercial service in South America and Africa. , the Japan Air Self-Defense Force retires the YS-11 after 57 years of service.

In popular culture
In railroad journals, YS-11 was linked to the 0 Series Shinkansen, another Japanese-made form of transportation that debuted around the time of the 1964 Olympics. Additionally, the Shinkansen and the YS-11 were both developed by individuals who were involved with the creation of military aircraft (this was to be expected with an airplane like the YS-11, but men like Migi Tadanao and Matsudaira Tadashi were also involved with the Shinkansen).

Variants
 YS-11
 YS-11-100
Initial production variant. 23,500 kg (51,810 lb) gross weight. 48 built.
 YS-11A-200
Increased gross weight (24,500 kg (54,010 lb) passenger airliner.
 YS-11A-300
 Combi version of YS-11-200, fitted with large cargo door and capable of carrying both passengers and freight.
 YS-11A-400
Pure cargo version of -200, used only by Japanese defence forces.
 YS-11A-500
Passenger airliner with further increased (25,000 kg (55,110 lb)) gross weight produced from 1970.
 YS-11A-600
Combi version of -500.
 YS-11E
JASDF "Super YS" powered by T64-IHI-10J.

Customer variants
 YS-11-101: TOA Domestic Airlines
 YS-11-102: All Nippon Airways
 YS-11-103: Japan Air Self Defense Force
 YS-11-104: Japan Civil Aviation Bureau
 YS-11-105: Japan Air Self Defense Force
 YS-11-106: Japan Domestic Airlines
 YS-11-107: Filipinas Orient Airways
 YS-11-108: Japan Domestic Airlines
 YS-11-109: Japan Domestic Airlines
 YS-11-110: Japan Civil Aviation Bureau
 YS-11-111: All Nippon Airways
 YS-11-113: Japan Maritime Self Defense Force
 YS-11-114: TOA Airways
 YS-11-115: Aeronautic College
 YS-11-116: Filipinas Orient Airways
 YS-11-117: Hawaiian Airlines
 YS-11-118: Japan Civil Aviation Bureau
 YS-11-120: LANSA
 YS-11-121: Filipinas Orient Airways
 YS-11-124: Japan Domestic Airlines
 YS-11-125: Cruzeiro do Sul
 YS-11-128: Austral (later Austral Líneas Aéreas)
 YS-11-129: TOA Airways
 YS-11A-201: NAMC
 YS-11A-202: Cruzeiro do Sul
 YS-11A-205: Piedmont Airlines
 YS-11A-206: Japan Maritime Self Defense Force
 YS-11A-207: Japan Maritime Safety Agency
 YS-11A-208: All Nippon Airways
 YS-11A-209: Southwest Air Lines
 YS-11A-211: VASP
 YS-11A-212: VASP
 YS-11A-213: All Nippon Airways
 YS-11A-214: Southwest Air Lines
 YS-11A-217: Japan Domestic Airlines
 YS-11A-218: Japan Air Self Defense Force
 YS-11A-219: China Airlines
 YS-11A-220: Olympic Airways
 YS-11A-222: TOA Airways
 YS-11A-223: All Nippon Airways
 YS-11A-227: Japan Domestic Airlines / TOA Airways
 YS-11A-301: Korean Air Lines
 YS-11A-305: Japan Air Self Defense Force
 YS-11A-306: Transair
 YS-11A-307: Japan Domestic Airlines
 YS-11A-309: Aerotransportes Litoral Argentino (later Austral Líneas Aéreas)
 YS-11A-310: Korean Air Lines
 YS-11A-313: TOA Airways
 YS-11A-314: Air Afrique
 YS-11A-321: Air Gabon
 YS-11A-402: Japan Air Self Defense Force
 YS-11A-404: Japan Maritime Self Defense Force
 YS-11A-500: Piedmont Airlines
 YS-11A-523: Philippine Civil Aeronautics Administration
 YS-11A-621: Trans Gabon
 YS-11A-623: Pelita Air Service
 YS-11A-624: Japan Maritime Self Defense Force
 YS-11A-626: Reeve Aleutian Airways

Operators

Civil operators
Former and present operators of the NAMC YS-11 include:

 Aerolíneas Argentinas
 Aerotransportes Litoral Argentino
 Austral Líneas Aéreas

 Air Aruba

 Cruzeiro do Sul
 VASP

 BIMP - EAGA Air Alliance

 Norcanair
 Transair Ltd

 Societe Generale d'Alimentation

 Pyramid Airlines

 Trans Gabon Airlines
 Gabon Express
 Gabon Express Cargo

 Gambia AW

 Olympic Airways

 Bouraq Indonesia Airlines
 Pelita Air Service
 Mandala Airlines
 Merpati Nusantara Airlines

 Air Afrique

 Air Nippon 
 All Nippon Airways
 Japan Air Lines
 Japan Air System
 Japan Domestic Airlines
 Japan TransOcean Air
 Toa Airways
 Toa Domestic Airlines
 Nihon Kinkyori Airlines
 Southwest Air Lines Japan

 Aerolitoral
 Aerodan Cargo
 Gacela Air Cargo
 AeroSierra
 ALCON Servicios Aereos

 Líneas Aéreas Nacionales S.A.

 Philippine Airlines
 Air Philippines
Air Link International Airways
Airlink International Aviation College
 2GO
 Aboitiz Air
 Asian Spirit
 Aero Majestic Airways
 South Phoenix Airways

 Korean Air
 Korean Air Cargo

 China Airlines

 Air Star Zanzibar

 Air Caribbean

 Phuket Air
 Air Phoenix

 Global Air Cargo

 American Eagle
 Continental Express
 Piedmont Airlines
 Simmons Airlines
 Reeve Aleutian Airways
 Provincetown-Boston Airlines
 Pinehurst Airlines
 MPAC
 Midwest Air Charter/Airborne Express
 Far West Airlines
 Fort Worth Airlines
 Hawaiian Airlines
 Pacific Southwest Airlines 
 Mid Pacific Air 
 Tauk Tours
 United States Postal Service

Former military operators

 Greek Air Force – 6 ex-Olympic Airways YS-11A aircraft were supplied in 1981.

 Japan Air Self-Defense Force
 401st Tactical Airlift Squadron (1969–1989)
 402nd Tactical Airlift Squadron (1968–2001)
 403rd Tactical Airlift Squadron YS-11P (1978–2017)
 Flight Check Squadron YS-11FC (–2021)
 Electronic Warfare Squadron YS-11EA
 Electronic Intelligence Squadron YS-11EB
 Japan Maritime Self-Defense Force
 Air Transport Squadron 61 YS-11M/M-A (1971–2014)
 Japan Coast Guard (1969–2011)

JSDF delivery breakdown:
JASDF
2 YS-11EA for Electronic Warfare
4 YS-11EB for ELINT
3 YS-11FC for Flight Checker
1 YS-11NT for Navigation Trainer
3 YS-11P for Passenger/VIP Transport

JMSDF
2 YS-11M for Freighter
2 YS-11M-A for Freighter
6 YS-11T-A for MPA trainer

Accidents and incidents
There have been over twenty hull loss accidents involving YS-11 aircraft.
 13 November 1966, All Nippon Airways Flight 533 crashed into the sea near Matsuyama, Japan with the loss of all five crew and 45 passengers.
 20 October 1969, All Nippon Airways Flight 104 overran the runway at Miyazaki Airport, Japan. All four crew and 49 passengers survived.
 11 December 1969, a Korean Air flight from Gangneung to Seoul was hijacked and flown to Sǒndǒk Airfield near Wonsan. The aircraft was damaged on landing and written off. The aircraft, its crew, and seven passengers are still held in North Korean territory.
 12 August 1970, China Airlines Flight 206 crashed into Yuan Mountain on approach to Taipei, Taiwan. Two crew and 12 passengers were killed.
 1 April 1971, a Merpati Nusantara Airlines YS-11 made a wheels-up landing at Kemayoran Airport, Jakarta Indonesia while on a training flight.
 3 July 1971, Toa Domestic Airlines Flight 63 flew into Yokotsu Mountain while on approach to Hakodate Airport, Japan. All four crew and 64 passengers were killed, the worst loss of life in an accident involving the YS-11.
 7 November 1971, A VASP YS-11 was destroyed by fire after a candle was lit inside when the aircraft was being guarded overnight after being bogged down at Aragarças Airport in Aragarças, Brazil. Both guards were killed.
All four crew and 21 passengers were killed.
 18 October 1972,  a Cruzeiro do Sul YS-11 overshot the runway at Congonhas Airport, São Paulo and was damaged beyond repair.
 21 October 1972, an Olympic Airlines YS-11 en route from Corfu (Kerkyra) to Athens crashed into the sea in Voula, whilst attempting an approach to Ellinikon International Airport, Athens, in a heavy storm. One crew member (the co-pilot) and 36 passengers were killed, while the captain, the two stewardesses and 16 passengers survived.
 23 October 1973, a VASP YS-11 overran the runway at Santos Dumont Airport, Rio de Janeiro after a rejected take-off and ended up in Guanabara Bay. Eight passengers were killed.
Aircraft was written off.
 6 November 1974, a Reeve Aleutian Airways YS-11 was written off in a hangar fire at Anchorage, Alaska.
 28 May 1975, TOA Domestic Airlines Flight 621 was damaged beyond repair in a landing accident at Osaka International Airport when a tyre burst and the aircraft departed the runway.
 23 November 1976, Olympic Airways Flight 830 an Olympic Airlines YS-11 flew into mountain Metaxas near the village of Servia in Kozani, Greece, in low clouds and almost zero visibility. All four crew and 46 passengers were killed.
 29 April 1977, a Cruzeiro YS-11 departed the runway on landing at Ministro Victor Konder International Airport, Navegantes, Brazil.
 17 July 1977, a Philippine Airlines YS-11 ditched on approach to Mactan–Cebu International Airport after an engine failure.
 11 March 1983, Nihon Kinkyori Airlines Flight 497 undershot the runway at Nakashibetsu Airport, Japan.
 13 January 1987, a Mid Pacific Air YS-11 force landed in a field at Remington, Indiana after both engines were mismanaged.
 10 January 1988, TOA Domestic Airlines Flight 670 overran the runway at Miho-Yonago Airport, Yonago, Japan after a rejected take-off and ended up in the sea. Aircraft had not been de-iced prior to take-off.
 15 March 1989, a Mid Pacific Air YS-11 undershot the runway at Purdue University Airport, Lafayette, Indiana due to loss of pitch control caused by icing on the tail. The aircraft was on a positioning flight, both crew members were killed.
 6 March 1992, an Airborne Express YS-11 made a wheels-up landing at Airborne Airpark, Wilmington, Ohio while on a training flight due to pilot error.
 24 June 1996, an Air Philippines YS-11 struck a ground power unit while taxiing at Naga Airport, Naga City. Aircraft was destroyed in the subsequent fire.
 16 February 2000, Air Nippon Flight 354 departed the runway at Okadama Airport, Sapporo, Japan and collided with a bank of snow.
 3 November 2001, a YS-11 being prepared for delivery to an airline in Burundi was destroyed by a fire caused by a stray firework at London Southend Airport.
 11 September 2005, Phuket Airlines Flight 326 skids off the runway at Mae Sot Airport, Thailand.
 2 January 2008, Asian Spirit Flight 321 suffered an undercarriage collapse on landing at Masbate Airport, Philippines.
 28 September 2009, Japanese Maritime Self-Defense Force YS-11M-A serial number 9044 overran the runway upon landing at Ozuki Air Field and was substantially damaged.

Aircraft on display

Brazil
 2080 – YS-11A-200 on static display as a restaurant in Tijucas, Santa Catarina.

Greece
2137 (Hellenic Air Force) - YS-11A-220 at the Elefsis Heritage Park

Japan
 JA8611 – YS-11 prototype at the Museum of Aeronautical Science in Narita, Chiba.
 JA8731 - YS-11A-213 at the Kakamigahara Aerospace Museum.
 JA8732 – YS-11A-213 at the Tokorozawa Aviation Memorial Park in Tokorozawa, Saitama.
JA8733 - YS-11A-213 at Saga Airport
JA8734 – YS-11A-500R at Tajima Airport in Toyooka, Hyogo Prefecture.
JA8743 - YS-11A-213 at Sanuki Kodomono Kuni amusement park near Takamatsu Airport.
JA8766 - YS-11A-227 at Misawa Aviation & Science Museum
JA8809 - YS-11A-202 at the Michinoku Traditional Wooden Boat Museum.
 52-1152 (JASDF) at the Aichi Museum of Flight in Komaki, Aichi Prefecture.
 JA8160 The first mass-produced YS-11 has been in storage at Haneda Airport since 1999, where it has been maintained and kept airworthy by the National Museum of Nature and Science and is occasionally available for public viewing.

Philippines
 RP-77 – YS-11A-523 at the Philippine Air Force Aerospace Museum in Manila, National Capital.

Thailand
 HS-APA YS-11A-227 at Jesada Technik Museum
 HS-KCU YS-11A-213 at Nong Khor

United States
 P4-KFD – YS-11-120 on static display at the Grissom Air Museum near Peru, Indiana.

Specifications (YS-11A-200)

See also

References

Citations

Bibliography

 
 Lehman, William. "US Airways." Arcadia Publishing, 2013. 
 Odagiri, Hiroyuki., Goto Odagiri and Akira Gotō. "Technology and Industrial Development in Japan." Clarendon Press, 1996.

External links 

 YS-11 photographs by Tony Hara
 

1960s Japanese airliners
MITI projects
YS-11
Twin-turboprop tractor aircraft
Aircraft first flown in 1962
Low-wing aircraft